Charis Bekker (born 14 March 2004) is an Australian cricketer who plays as a right-handed batter and slow left-arm orthodox bowler for Western Australia in the Women's National Cricket League (WNCL) and Perth Scorchers in the Women's Big Bash League (WBBL).

Domestic career
Bekker plays grade cricket for Subiaco-Floreat Cricket Club. She made her debut for Western Australia on 27 February 2022, against South Australia in the WNCL. She went on to play five matches overall for the side that season, including scoring 36* against South Australia and taking 2/25 from her 10 overs against Queensland. She played ten matches for the side in the 2022–23 WNCL, scoring 83 runs and taking two wickets. She was also in the Perth Scorchers squad in the 2022–23 WBBL, but did not play a match.

International career
In December 2022, Bekker was selected in the Australia Under-19 squad for the 2023 ICC Under-19 Women's T20 World Cup. She played two matches at the tournament, taking one wicket.

References

External links

2004 births
Living people
Place of birth missing (living people)
Australian women cricketers
Western Australia women cricketers